Etoile Island is an island in the Marshall Islands. It is one of the many islands that surround the Likiep Atoll lagoon on the southern edge.

References

Likiep Atoll
Islands of the Marshall Islands